Christos Gravius (born 14 October 1997) is a Swedish footballer who plays for Degerfors IF as a midfielder. He made his debut in Allsvenskan for AIK 12 July 2015 as a 17-year-old against GIF Sundsvall.

Personal life
Born in Sweden, Gravius is of Greek descent.

References

External links
 
 
 AIK profile 

1997 births
Living people
Swedish footballers
Swedish people of Greek descent
Allsvenskan players
Superettan players
AIK Fotboll players
Jönköpings Södra IF players
Degerfors IF players
Sweden youth international footballers
People from Solna Municipality
Association football midfielders
Sportspeople from Stockholm County